A hospital is an institution for health care providing patient treatment with specialized staff and equipment.

Hospital may also refer to:

People
 Janette Turner Hospital (born 1942), Australian novelist
 Ralph Hospital (1891–1972), U.S. Army officer during World War I and World War II
 Michel de L'Hospital (–1573), French humanist and politician
 Guillaume de L'Hospital (1661–1704), French mathematician

Places
 Hospital, County Limerick, a town in the Republic of Ireland
 Hospital (district), a district of the San José canton, in the San José province of Costa Rica

Literature
 Hospital (novel), a 2007 novel by Toby Litt
 The Hospital, a book by Jan de Hartog about the 1960s Houston charity hospitals

Film and television
 Hospital (1970 film), a 1970 documentary film
 The Hospital, a 1971 Academy Award-winning black comedy film
 The Hospital (2013 film), a horror film
 Hospital!, a 1997 Channel 5 UK one-off comedy
 The Hospital (TV series), a 2006 Taiwanese TV drama series
 "Hospital" (Bluey), an episode of the first season of the animated series Bluey

Music
 Hospital Records, a record label based in London
 Hospital (album)

Songs
 "Hospital", by The Lemonheads from the album Car Button Cloth
 "Hospital", by The Used from the album Lies for the Liars
 "Hospital", by Jonathan Richman and The Modern Lovers
 "Hospital", by Nephew featuring L.O.C.

Transportation
 Hospital (TransMilenio), Bogotá, Colombia
 Hospital station (Medellín), Colombia
 Hospital metro station (Monterrey), Mexico
 Hospital metro station (Valparaíso), Chile
 Hospital (Mexibús), Mexico
 Hospitales (Buenos Aires Underground), Argentina
 Hospitales metro station, Santiago
 Hospital General (disambiguation)

Other uses
 The Hospital (club), an artists club in London

See also
 L'Hospital's rule, a theorem in mathematics developed in 1696 by Guillaume de l'Hospital
 Hospitalier, a Christian order of French knights
 L'Hôpital (disambiguation)